Once in a Lifetime is a studio album by Slim Whitman, released in 1961 on Imperial Records.

Release history 
The album was issued in the United States by Imperial Records as a 12-inch long-playing record, catalog number LP 9156 (mono).

Around 1966, it was reissued under the title Cool Water.

Track listing

References 

1961 albums
Slim Whitman albums
Imperial Records albums